Lanton Mills is an American comedy short film written and directed by Terrence Malick and starring Malick, Warren Oates, Harry Dean Stanton (in a leading role), and Paula Mandel. The film was Malick's thesis project for the American Film Institute, was completed in 1969, and is known to have screened in 1974.

Summary
The story concerns two apparently 19th-century cowboys (Stanton and Malick) plotting to rob a bank in Texas, which they do in the 20th century.

A film writer who viewed a VHS copy at the American Film Institute described it:

The producer was John Roper, the cinematographer Caleb Deschanel, and the editor John Palmer, with Malick composing the music.

The film was influenced by Don Quixote and classic westerns.

Cast
Lanton: Harry Dean Stanton (as Dean Stanton)
Tilman: Terrence Malick
Gunman: Warren Oates
Phantom: Lash Larue
Mute: Tony Bill
Teller: Paul Ehrman
Customer in Bank: Paula Mandel
1st cop: Ken Smith
2nd cop: John Schmitz

See also
 List of American films of 1969
Badlands-Malick's 1973 feature film debut also about 20th century outlaws
List of works influenced by Don Quixote
List of Western films

References

External links

MUBI
Leterboxd

1969 films
Films directed by Terrence Malick
1969 comedy films
1969 short films
American comedy short films
Films set in the 20th century
1960s English-language films
1960s American films